Sør-Rogaland District Court is a district court located in Rogaland and Agder counties in Norway. This court is based at three different courthouses which are located in Stavanger, Sandnes, and Egersund. The court serves the southern part of Rogaland plus one municipality (Sirdal) in western Agder. The court takes cases from 17 municipalities. The court in Egersund accepts cases from the municipalities of Bjerkreim, Eigersund, Gjesdal, Lund, Sirdal, and Sokndal. The court in Sandnes accepts cases from the municipalities of Hå, Klepp, Sandnes, and Time. The court in Stavanger accepts cases from the municipalities of Hjelmeland, Kvitsøy, Randaberg, Sola, Stavanger, and Strand. The court is subordinate to the Gulating Court of Appeal.

The court is led by a chief judge and several other judges. The court is a court of first instance. Its judicial duties are mainly to settle criminal cases and to resolve civil litigation as well as bankruptcy. The administration and registration tasks of the court include death registration, issuing certain certificates, performing duties of a notary public, and officiating civil wedding ceremonies. Cases from this court are heard by a combination of professional judges and lay judges.

History
This court was established on 26 April 2021 after the old Dalane District Court, Jæren District Court, and Stavanger District Court were all merged into one court. The new district court system continues to use the courthouses from the predecessor courts.

References

District courts of Norway
2021 establishments in Norway
Organisations based in Stavanger
Organisations based in Sandnes
Organisations based in Egersund